The Finer Points of Sausage Dogs is a novel by Scottish author and academic Alexander McCall Smith. The book relates further matters in the life of the main character, Professor Dr Moritz-Maria von Igelfeld, following on from the first book of the series, Portuguese Irregular Verbs.

The Professor is a troubled German academic whose life's achievement is the (fictional) book, Portuguese Irregular Verbs.

The book relates details of his troubled relationships with the other major characters of the book series, Professor Dr Dr (honoris causa) Florianus Prinzel and Professor Dr Detlev Amadeus Unterholzer, all at the fictional Institute of Romance Philology at Regensburg, Germany; and, especially, the outcomes of von Igelfeld's academic journey to the University of Arkansas while staying at Fayetteville, Arkansas.

The book has five chapters:
 The Finer Points of Sausage Dogs
 A Leg to Stand on
 On the Couch
 The Bones of Father Christmas
 The Perfect Imperfect

The illustrations are by Iain McIntosh.

The first story was first published in a limited edition of 400 copies in 1998.

Book series
This is one book of a series:
 Portuguese Irregular Verbs (1997)
 The Finer Points of Sausage Dogs (2003)
 At the Villa of Reduced Circumstances (2003)
 Unusual Uses for Olive Oil (2011)

References

External links
Author's page at Random House publishers
Encyclopedia of Arkansas History & Culture entry

The 2½ Pillars of Wisdom
2003 British novels
Novels set in Germany
Novels set in Arkansas
University of Arkansas
Regensburg
Polygon Books books